Tɔfin (Toffi) is a Gbe language of Benin.

References

Gbe languages
Languages of Benin